This is a discography of Bollywood composer duo Shankar–Jaikishan, also known as S-J in short, consisting of music directors duo Shankar Singh Ram Singh Raghuvanshi and Jaikishan Dayabhai Panchal.

Discography

External links
 
 

Discographies of Indian artists
Films scored by Shankar–Jaikishan